Palestine Stadium is located in Gaza City on the Gaza Strip. It is the national stadium and the home of Palestine national football team. The stadium's capacity is around 10,000. 

It was bombed by Israel on April 1, 2006, directly on the centre spot, and is currently unusable due to the crater formed. FIFA has announced that it will fund the repair work. It was again bombed on November 19, 2012, by the Israeli Defence Force as part of Operation Pillar of Cloud. Israel claimed that the latest bombing was due to its  use by militants to launch rockets targeting Israel. The stadium and a nearby indoor sports hall suffered major damage and resulted in  notable football players from around the globe releasing a signed petition.

As of 2019, the stadium had been repaired by FIFA and has hosted several events, both in the indoor sports halls and the outdoor field.

References 

Football venues in the State of Palestine
Palestinian territories
Buildings and structures in Gaza City
Sport in the Gaza Strip